Union National Bank Building may refer to:

 The Carlyle (Pittsburgh), Pennsylvania, U.S.
 Union National Bank Building (Columbia, South Carolina), U.S.